Ney Franco da Silveira Júnior (born 22 July 1966), known as Ney Franco, is a Brazilian football manager.

Career
Born in Vargem Alegre, Minas Gerais, Franco worked in Atlético Mineiro and Cruzeiro's youth categories before being named the latter's interim manager on three occasions, one in 2002 and two in 2004. Ahead of the 2005 campaign, he was appointed manager of Ipatinga as the club agreed to a partnership deal with Cruzeiro, and lifted the year's Campeonato Mineiro.

On 22 May 2006, after again reaching the finals of the state league, Franco was named manager of Flamengo, replacing sacked Waldemar Lemos. He won the year's Copa do Brasil in July, defeating Vasco da Gama in the finals; Franco previously took Ipatinga to the semifinals of the very same competition, the club's best-ever position. In the 2007 season, he won the Taça Guanabara and the Campeonato Carioca, but was sacked on 29 July, being later replaced by Joel Santana.

Appointed at the helm of Atlético Paranaense on 30 August 2007, Franco was sacked in May of the following year. On 11 July 2008, he was hired by Botafogo, but left the club on 10 August 2009; hours later, he was announced at Coritiba, suffering relegation at the end of the campaign.

On 23 September 2010, Franco was appointed as coach of Brazil under-20 team. He remained in charge of Coritiba until the end of the year, winning the Série B and returning to the top tier at first attempt. For the national team, he won the 2011 South American Youth Championship, qualifying to the 2011 FIFA U-20 World Cup (also won by Brazil) and the 2012 Summer Olympics.

On 5 July 2012, Franco replaced Emerson Leão at São Paulo, signing for the rest of season. Exactly one year after his signing, and in spite of winning the 2012 Copa Sudamericana, he was dismissed after being knocked out of the 2013 Copa Libertadores.

On 2 September 2013, Franco was appointed Vitória manager, and finished the season in the fifth position. The following 13 May he returned to Flamengo, but went back to Vitória on 21 August. In December, he resigned from the latter club.

On 8 June 2015, Franco returned to Coritiba, but was sacked on 3 November, with five matches left on the season. On 27 March 2017, after more than a year without coaching, he took over Sport, being relieved from his duties on 25 May after only 58 days in charge.

On 6 May 2018, Franco was announced at Goiás in the second division. In December, after achieving promotion to the first division, he resigned.

On 28 March 2019, Franco replaced Claudinei Oliveira at Chapecoense. He was sacked on 24 July, and returned to Goiás on 8 August, again replacing Claudinei Oliveira.

Franco was sacked by the Esmeraldino on 20 August 2020, following a 3–1 home loss against Fortaleza. On 8 September, he replaced Enderson Moreira at the helm of his first club Cruzeiro, now in the second division; his reign at the latter club only lasted seven matches, however.

On 9 July 2021, after nearly one year without a club, Franco was named manager of CSA, but was still sacked on 30 August after 12 matches.

Honours

Club
Ipatinga
Campeonato Mineiro: 2005

Flamengo
Copa do Brasil: 2006
Taça Guanabara: 2007
Campeonato Carioca: 2007

Botafogo
Taça Guanabara: 2009

Coritiba
Campeonato Paranaense: 2010
Campeonato Brasileiro Série B: 2010

São Paulo
Copa Sudamericana: 2012

International
Brazil U20
South American Youth Championship: 2011
Mediterranean International Cup: 2011
FIFA U-20 World Cup: 2011

References

External links

 

1966 births
Living people
Brazilian football managers
Campeonato Brasileiro Série A managers
Campeonato Brasileiro Série B managers
Cruzeiro Esporte Clube managers
Ipatinga Futebol Clube managers
CR Flamengo managers
Club Athletico Paranaense managers
Botafogo de Futebol e Regatas managers
Coritiba Foot Ball Club managers
São Paulo FC managers
Esporte Clube Vitória managers
Sport Club do Recife managers
Goiás Esporte Clube managers
Associação Chapecoense de Futebol managers
Centro Sportivo Alagoano managers
Brazil national under-20 football team managers